The 1987 Virginia Slims of San Diego was a women's tennis tournament played on outdoor hard courts at the San Diego Tennis & Racquet Club in San Diego, California in the United States and was part of the Category 1+ tier of the 1987 WTA Tour. It was the fourth edition of the tournament and ran from August 3 through August 9, 1987. Third-seeded Raffaella Reggi won the singles title.

Finals

Singles
 Raffaella Reggi defeated  Anne Minter 6–0, 6–4
 It was Reggi's 1st singles title of the year and the 4th of her career.

Doubles
 Jana Novotná /  Catherine Suire defeated  Elise Burgin /  Sharon Walsh 6–3, 6–4

References

External links
 ITF tournament edition details
 Tournament draws

Virginia Slims of San Diego
Southern California Open
Virg
Virg